The East Lancs EL2000 is a type of single-decker bus body built on a wide variety of bus chassis by East Lancashire Coachbuilders.

Description
The EL2000 has an Alusuisse aluminium frame. It has bowed sides and a bowed top half of the rear end, with a high-set rear window.

There was some variability in the height and shape of the side windows, and the style of windscreen. One common design of windscreen was square-cornered, tapered in towards the top and curved around to the sides. Another was a two-piece flat windscreen with radiused outer corners. A third design used was a double-curvature windscreen with an arched top.

Many different chassis types, both new and secondhand, were fitted with EL2000 bodywork. These include:

 Leyland Leopard (rebodies)
 Leyland Tiger (rebodies)
 Volvo B58 (rebodies)
 Volvo B10M (both new and rebodies)
 Volvo B6
 Dennis Falcon
 Dennis Dart
 Dennis Lance
 Scania K93
 Scania N113

History

The EL2000 made its first appearance on rebodied Leyland Tigers at the end of 1989. It was superseded as a step-entrance body by the Flyte, starting in 1996 and stopped production in 2001.

East Lancs first rebodied an accident-damaged Leyland Atlantean with an EL2000 body for Sheffield Omnibus in 1992, with the conversion aimed at increasing its service life. Further rebodies and refurbishments were marketed as the 'Atlantean Sprint', with Southampton Citybus making orders for ten of its Atlanteans to be rebodied; only five of these rebodies were completed for Southampton.

See also 

 List of buses

References

External links

EL2000
Buses of the United Kingdom
Midibuses
Vehicles introduced in 1989